1st Boston Society of Film Critics Awards
March 22, 1981

Best Film:
 Raging Bull 
The 1st Boston Society of Film Critics Awards honored the best filmmaking of 1980. The awards were given on 22 March 1981.

Winners
Best Film:
Raging Bull
Best Actor:
Robert De Niro – Raging Bull
Best Actress:
Gena Rowlands – Gloria
Best Supporting Actor:
Jason Robards – Melvin and Howard
Best Supporting Actress:
Mary Steenburgen – Melvin and Howard
Best Director:
Roman Polanski – Tess
Best Screenplay:
Bo Goldman – Melvin and Howard
Best Cinematography:
Michael Chapman – Raging Bull
Best Documentary:
Charleen or How Long Has This Been Going On?
Best Foreign-Language Film:
The Last Metro (Le dernier métro) • France
Best Independent Film:
Return of the Secaucus 7
Best American Film:
Melvin and Howard

External links
Past Winners

References 
1980 Boston Society of Film Critics Awards Internet Movie Database

1980
1980 film awards
Boston
Boston
March 1981 events in the United States